Thomas Harrison (born 1681) was a British Army officer and politician who sat in the House of Commons from 1728 to 1734.

Harrison was baptized on 24 April 1681, the sixth son  of Richard Harrison, MP  of Balls Park and his wife Audrey Villiers, daughter of George Villiers, 4th Viscount Grandison.

Harrison joined the army and was a cornet in the 4th Dragoon Guards in 1697, ADC to the  Duke of Ormonde, Lord lieutenant of Ireland before 1705,  captain and lieutenant colonel in the 1st Foot Guards in  1705, brevet colonel in 1707 and colonel of the 6th Foot from 1708 to 1716. He was  adjutant-general in Spain in  1708 and brought back Lord Stanhope’s despatches after the victory at the Battle of Saragossa in 1710, for which he received £1,000 from Queen Anne. In 1715 he was  adjutant-general in Scotland where  he was present at the Battle of Sheriffmuir and brought the Duke of Argyll's despatches to George I, who gave him £500. He sold his regiment in March 1716.

Harrison stood for Parliament at Steyning at a by-election  in 1724, but was defeated in a contest. He was brought in as Member of Parliament for Old Sarum at a by-election on 30 May 1728 when Thomas Pitt  recruited two voters to defeat the single supporter of Henry Fox. In Parliament he voted with the Administration on the Hessians in 1730 but against them on the Excise Bill in 1733 and on the repeal of the Septennial Act in 1734.

Harrison was probably unmarried and died  before 1755. His brothers  Edward and George Harrison were also MPs.

References

1681 births
4th Royal Irish Dragoon Guards officers
Members of the Parliament of Great Britain for English constituencies
British MPs 1727–1734
Year of death unknown
Royal Warwickshire Fusiliers officers
Grenadier Guards officers
British Army personnel of the War of the Spanish Succession